The Ourse, or Ourse de Ferrère, is a French river in the Pyrenees, a tributary of the Garonne. It forms the Barousse valley.

Geography 

According to the Sandre, its mother-course is the ruisseau de Seuès which begins at 1,770 m high, NNW of the lac de Crouès.

After a few km, it is joined left by the Salabe runlet and then becomes l'Ourse de Ferrère, which joins l'Ourse de Sost at Mauléon-Barousse and then becomes l'Ourse.

It joins the Garonne left bank at 441 m high in the commune of Loures-Barousse.

The stream length of the path « Ruisseau de Seuès-Ourse de Ferrère-Ourse » is 25.4 km, for a watershed of 139 km2.

L'Ourse runs through 13 communes in the Hautes-Pyrénées, all located in the canton of Mauléon-Barousse, from high to low : Ferrère, Ourde, Mauléon-Barousse, Troubat, Bramevaque, Gembrie, Antichan, Créchets, Anla, Aveux, Sarp, Izaourt, et Loures-Barousse.

It has 20 tributaries recorded by the Sandre, of which two are more than 5 km long :

 the Salabe, 6.0 km, left bank,
 l'Ourse de Sost, 12,4 km, right bank.

References 

Rivers of France
Rivers of Occitania (administrative region)
Rivers of Hautes-Pyrénées